The Beneficiary is a 1997 Australian crime thriller short film directed by Graeme Burfoot.

The film was aired at several international film festivals, such as the Torino Film Festival, the Cork Film Festival, the Tampere International Short Film Festival, the Hamburg Short Film Festival, the Edinburgh International Film Festival and the Seattle International Film Festival.

Cast
 Barry Otto as Lenart Dunbar
 Helene Joy as Helen Desaree

Accolades
 Winner of 1997 Australian Film Institute's Animal Logic Award for Best Short Fiction Film
 Winner of 1998 Palm Springs International Film Festival of Short Films Best Live Action Under 15 minutes award
 Short-listed in final ten shorts at 1999 Academy Awards

References

External links

Australian crime thriller films
1997 short films
1997 crime thriller films
1990s English-language films
Australian drama short films
1990s Australian films